Whitfield J. Bell Jr. (December 3, 1914 - January 2, 2009) was an American author and an expert on early American History, Science, the American Philosophical Society and Benjamin Franklin and his writings.

Early life 
Bell was born in Newburgh, New York and grew up in suburban Philadelphia. He went to school at Lower Merion High School (PA) and graduated in 1931.

Education and career 
After Bell graduated Lower Merion High School, he enrolled in Dickinson College. He began studying law but did not complete his classes, deciding instead to pursue his interest in history.

Bell joined the Free Masons' Cumberland Star Lodge of Carlisle and achieved the status of Master Mason. He wrote the history of the Lodge to mark its 150th anniversary. Bell earned his doctorate in history in 1947, from the University of Pennsylvania. 

Bell tried to enlist in the Army and the Navy when the United States entered the World War II, but was rejected due to poor eyesight. He drove an ambulance in North Africa, Italy and Germany. He also helped to liberate the Bergen-Belsen concentration camp.

Bell taught history at Dickinson (1945-1950) and was appointed to the Boyd Lee Spahr endowed Chair of American History in 1950. In the same year, he edited the first volume of Spahr Lectures, Bulwark of Liberty. In 1953-54 he worked as a visiting editor of William and Mary Quarterly in Williamsburg, Virginia. He moved to work at the American Philosophical Society in 1955 to work on its growing collection of Benjamin Franklin letters and writings.

Bell's career culminated as executive officer and librarian of the American Philosophical Society.

Bell retired in 1983 and thereafter, from 1984 to 1991, he was employed as a curator, during which time he continued to perform his own research, and published more than one hundred articles involving book reviews, and encyclopedia articles which he had published in six different works.

Awards and recognition 
Bell's contributions were recognized by the American Association for the History of Medicine 1996 lifetime achievement award.

A volume of works dedicated to Whitfield Bell was published in 1986.

Bell gave nine interviews to Michael J. Birkner, a professor of history at Gettysburg College.

See also
 The Papers of Benjamin Franklin

Selected bibliography 
Bell, Whitfield Jenks. Early American science: needs and opportunities for study. Russell & Russell, 1955.
Bell, Whitfield Jenks. John Morgan: continental doctor. University of Pennsylvania Press, 1965.
Franklin, Benjamin, Leonard Woods Labaree, Whitfield Jenks Bell Jr, and Whitfield Jenks Bell. The Papers of Benjamin Franklin. New Haven, CT: Yale University Press, 1966.
Bell, Whitfield Jenks. Patriot-improvers:-1997.-XX-531 p. Vol. 226. American Philosophical Society, 2010.

References 

Whitfield J. Bell Jr., Gardener Digital Library. online

1914 births
2009 deaths
American Freemasons
American librarians
Dickinson College alumni
Dickinson College faculty
Lower Merion High School alumni
University of Pennsylvania School of Arts and Sciences alumni
20th-century American male writers